Michael Kevin Kearney (born January 18, 1984) is an American college teaching assistant and game show contestant. He is known for setting several world records related to graduating at a young age, as well as teaching college students 
while still a teenager. Additionally, as a game-show contestant, he has won over one million dollars.

Early life
Michael was homeschooled by his mother and father, especially his mother, a Japanese American. He was diagnosed with ADHD, but his parents declined to use the offered prescription of Ritalin. His younger sister, Maeghan, is also a child prodigy and graduated from college at the age of sixteen. According to psychology professor Huey H Miller III, Kearney was helped to adjust well to his surroundings by his parents' determination, and the "take-on-the-world" attitude they passed down to him.

Kearney attended San Marin High School in Novato, California, for one year, graduating at the age of six in 1990. In 1994, Kearney and his parents were on The Tonight Show.

College education

Kearney graduated from high school at age 6 and went to Santa Rosa Junior College in Sonoma County, California, where he obtained an Associate of Science in Geology at age 8. In 1993, his family moved to Alabama. Circa 1996, he was interviewed by Meredith Vieira on Turning Point (ABC News). As of 2019, Kearney remained the youngest person to have a high-school diploma and undergraduate degrees.

At the age of 8 he enrolled at The University of South Alabama, where he received in 1994 a bachelor's degree in anthropology and is listed in the Guinness Book as the world's youngest university graduate at the age of ten. At the age of 14 he obtained a master's degree in chemistry at Middle Tennessee State University. At age 18 he obtained his master's degree in computer science at Vanderbilt University.

Research and teaching
Kearney graduated from Middle Tennessee State University with a master's degree in biochemistry at the age of fourteen.  His 118-page thesis was entitled "Kinetic Isotope Effects of Thymidine Phosphorylase"; the research focused on the kinetics of a glycosyltransferase involved in nucleotide synthesis. At the time, Kearney was the world's youngest postgraduate (the master's degree record was since broken in 1999 by Tathagat Avatar Tulsi).

In 1996, the family moved to Murfreesboro, Tennessee, and Kearney attended Vanderbilt University, taking classes and, by age sixteen, teaching as well (he was not yet legally able to drive).  Kearney received his second master's degree, this one from Vanderbilt University, at age seventeen or eighteen, in computer science.  Kearney received his doctorate in chemistry at age 22, having returned to Middle Tennessee State University as a teaching assistant (also in chemistry).

Involvement with game shows
When young, Kearney attempted a career as a game-show host; he and his parents moved to Hollywood, to shoot a pilot episode, but the proposed game-show was not picked up.

In October 2006, Kearney became a finalist on the trivia-and-puzzle game Gold Rush, winning $100,000.  In November 2006, in front of a national audience on Entertainment Tonight, he went on to win the grand prize of an additional $1 million.

Kearney was a contestant on Who Wants to be a Millionaire? which aired on April 25 & 28, 2008, winning twenty-five thousand dollars. He was also a contestant on Million Dollar Password which aired on June 14, 2009, but he did not pass the elimination round (losing the tiebreaker).

Life after education
In 2018, he was working for an improv theater group in Nashville.

See also
 Intellectual giftedness

References

External links
 
 
 

American people of Japanese descent
1984 births
Living people
University of South Alabama alumni
Middle Tennessee State University alumni
Vanderbilt University faculty
Vanderbilt University alumni
Santa Rosa Junior College alumni